Aadhyathe Katha is a 1972 Indian Malayalam film, directed by K. S. Sethumadhavan and produced by K. S. R. Moorthy. The film stars Prem Nazir, Vijayasree, Sujatha and Kaviyoor Ponnamma in the lead roles. The film had musical score by M. K. Arjunan.

It is the debut movie of Janardanan

Cast

Prem Nazir as Soman
Vijayasree as Rajakumari
Sujatha as Nalini
Jayabharathi (guest appearance) as ghost of Brahmin lady
Kaviyoor Ponnamma as Ammukuttyamma
Bahadoor as Kuttan Pillai
Sreelatha Namboothiri as Leelamma
Sreemoolanagaram Vijayan as Naanu Ammavan
Sankaradi as Appu Pillai
Adoor Pankajam as Appu Pillai's wife
N. Govindankutty as Pankajakshan Pillai (a.k.a. Inquilab Pankan)
Alummoodan as Padmanabhan Pillai
Sarasamma as Kochukarthyayani
Jameela Malik as Padmini
Janardanan as Mohan
Khadeeja as Kunjulakshmi teacher
Jaya Gopalan as Sulochana
Master Vijayakumar as Bhaskaran

Soundtrack
The music was composed by M. K. Arjunan and the lyrics were written by Vayalar Ramavarma.

References

External links
 

1972 films
1970s Malayalam-language films